Rudolf Pichler (20 September 1930 – 25 July 2011) was an Austrian football forward who played for Austria in the 1960 European Nations' Cup. He also played for 1. Wiener Neustädter SC, FK Austria Wien and SV Austria Salzburg.

References

1930 births
2011 deaths
Austrian footballers
Austria international footballers
Association football forwards
FK Austria Wien players
FC Red Bull Salzburg players
1. Wiener Neustädter SC players